Hologram is the first Japanese extended play by South Korean singer Key. It was released digitally on December 21, 2018, through EMI Records, with its physical release following on December 26, 2018.

Background and release
Key made his debut as a solo artist in November 2018 with the studio album Face. On December 5, 2018, it was revealed that he was planning to release his first Japanese extended play, including four original Japanese songs and the Japanese version of his Korean single "One of Those Nights". The cover artwork was designed by the illustrator Chocomoo in collaboration with Key. The songs "Hologram" and "Why Are You Here" were broadcast on J-Wave on December 12 and 13. The digital edition was released on December 21 and the physical edition was released on December 26. To promote the EP, Key held a live event titled Key Land at World Memorial Hall in Kobe on December 22 and Yokohama Arena on December 25.

Composition
Lead single and title track "Hologram" is retro-inspired, setting the tone for the rest of the EP. "Why Are You Here" is a duet with CoCo, and the lyrics concern romantic misunderstandings between a man and a woman. "Power" was written and composed by L'Arc-en-Ciel member Tetsuya, and is described as "hybrid rock groove". "City Girl" is about the feeling of being in love from the perspective of a city boy.

Track listing

Charts

Release history

References

2018 EPs
EMI Records EPs
SM Entertainment EPs
Japanese-language EPs
Key (entertainer) EPs